= Economic zone =

Economic zone may refer to:

- Exclusive economic zone, an area of sea over which a sovereign state has special rights
- Special economic zone, an area within a country in which the business and trade laws differ from elsewhere
